Moszkowski may refer to:

 Alexander Moszkowski (1851–1934), Jewish Polish-German writer and satirist
 Moritz Moszkowski (1854–1925), Romantic-era composer and Alexander's brother
 List of compositions by Moritz Moszkowski
 Étincelles (Moszkowski)
 Piano Concerto No. 2 (Moszkowski)
 Róża Etkin-Moszkowska (1908–1945), Polish pianist
 Anatolij Moszkowski

See also 
 Moszkowicz
 Moskowitz
 Moscheles
 Moskovsky (disambiguation)

Jewish surnames
Polish-language surnames

 Wolodarsky